The Treaty of Tunis was an agreement during the Eighth Crusade. It was signed in November 1270 between the Hafsid Sultan Muhammad I al-Mustansir and Crusaders shortly after Louis IX of France's death. The treaty guaranteed a  truce between the two armies. The treaty was quite beneficial to Charles of Anjou, who received one-third of a war indemnity from the Tunisians, and was promised that Hohenstaufen refugees in the sultanate would be expelled. During this treaty, the parties agreed on cessation of hostilities, the release of captives, security for businessmen, the freedom of missionaries to propagate Christianity and build churches in Tunisia, annual ransom payment by the Hafsids, and others.

References

Al-Maqrizi, Al Selouk Leme'refatt Dewall al-Melouk, Dar al-kotob, Cairo 1997. English translation by Bohn, Henry G., The Road to Knowledge of the Return of Kings, Chronicles of the Crusades, AMS Press, 1969.
Beebe, Bruce, "The English Baronage and the Crusade of 1270," in Bulletin of the Institute of Historical Research, vol. xlviii (118), November 1975, pp. 127–148.

Paterson, Linda (2003). "Lyric allusions to the crusades and the Holy Land." Colston Symposium. 
Richard, Jean. The Crusades, C.1071-c.1291, Cambridge University Press, 1999. 

Throop, Palmer A., "Criticism of Papal Crusade Policy in Old French and Provençal." Speculum, Vol. 13, No. 4. (October, 1938), pp. 379–412.

Eighth Crusade
Tunis
1270
Tunis